= Kwok Tong Chau =

Kwok Tong Chau (鄒國棠) is a Hong Kong professor of electrical engineering, whose research interests include electric vehicles and renewable energy. He is the associate dean of Faculty of Engineering at the University of Hong Kong. Chau received his bachelor's, master's, and PhD degrees from the University of Hong Kong, and taught at the Hong Kong Polytechnic (now the Hong Kong Polytechnic University) for four years before joining the faculty of his alma mater in 1995. He was named Fellow of the Institute of Electrical and Electronics Engineers (IEEE) in 2013 "for contributions to energy systems for electric and hybrid vehicles".
